The 1989 World Table Tennis Championships mixed doubles was the 40th edition of the mixed doubles championship.  

Yoo Nam-kyu and Hyun Jung-hwa defeated Zoran Kalinić and Gordana Perkučin in the final by two sets to nil.

Results

See also
List of World Table Tennis Championships medalists

References

-